The Battle off the coast of Jaffna – a naval battle fought between the Navy of Sri Lanka and Tamil Tiger ships. According to Sri Lankan sources, it took place on Saturday 1 November 2008 in the northern territorial waters of Sri Lanka off the coast of Jaffna during the Sri Lankan Civil War. A Sri Lankan government customs officer, D.K.P. Dassangayake, reported that the battle begun as the Navy met the rebel ships and exchanged fire.

Jaffna
Jaffna
November 2008 events in Asia
2008 in Sri Lanka
2008 in military history